Sishui County is a county of southwestern Shandong province, People's Republic of China. It is the easternmost county-level division of Jining City. It takes its name from the Si River, which flows through the county.

Administrative divisions
As 2012, this county is divided to 2 subdistricts, 8 towns and 3 townships.
Subdistricts
Sihe Subdistrict
Jihe Subdistrict

Towns

Townships
Shengshuiyu Township
Dahuanggou Township
Gaoyu Township

Climate

References

External links 
 Official homepage

Counties of Shandong
Jining